Abdul Jabbar Abdullah (1911 – July 9, 1969) was an Iraqi wave theory physicist, dynamical meteorologist, and President Emeritus of Baghdad University. Abdullah earned his Sc.D. degree in meteorology from the Massachusetts Institute of Technology in 1946, before being appointed head of the Iraqi Teacher Association, and then chairman of the Department of Physics, College of Education, Baghdad. In 1952, he became a visiting research professor in meteorology at New York University, and in 1965 he joined the National Center for Atmospheric Research as a scientific visitor.

In his memoir, nuclear physicist Khidir Hamza claims Abdullah not only taught him, but was also instrumental in getting the former into MIT to pursue a master's degree in nuclear engineering after Hamza's initial rejection by the institute. Khidir Hamza later became part of Iraq's nuclear research program, before defecting to the United States and testifying on the program before the Senate.

As a member of the Mandaean religious minority, and a democratic personality, Abdullah was harassed towards the end of his life and arrested. He was imprisoned for nearly a year but was released and later permitted to travel to the United States. There he held professorial and research posts at the University of Colorado Boulder in Boulder, and the State University of New York in Albany. He died on July 9, 1969.

Biography

Abdul Jabbar Abdullah was born to a Mandaean family in the town of Qal'at Saleh, Qal'at Saleh District, Maysan Province (formerly Al-Amaarah) in southeastern Iraq in 1911. 
Upon finishing his secondary school education in Baghdad, he left for Lebanon to pursue university education. There he enrolled at The American University of Beirut (AUB) where he majored in Physics and graduated with a BS in 1934. Later, after AUB, he did his post graduate studies at The Massachusetts Institute of Technology (MIT) where he earned his PhD.

Back in Iraq, Abdullah joined the Physics faculty at The Higher Normal College (later one of the constituent colleges of University of Baghdad), between 1949 and 1958 and became Chairman of the Physics Department.

In 1958, Abdullah was appointed secretary General of the newly constituted University of Baghdad, and in 1959 he became the University's President; remaining in this post until the February, right-wing ultra nationalist, coup d'etat which he was forced to resign, and badly treated for political reasons.

Research

Abdullah's research interests included cloud stratification, solitary waves, and pressure pumps.

Bibliography
Abdullah has published multiple books on atmospheric sciences, and was the editor and publisher of Iraq's sole science journal in the 1950s: "Proceedings of the Iraqi Scientific Society".

Books
Abdul Jabbar Abdullah, James J. O'Brien, National Center for Atmospheric Research (U.S.). Internal Gravity Waves of Finite Amplitude in a Stratified Incompressible Atmosphere: -- a Quasi-characteristic Method. National Center for Atmospheric Research.
Abdul Jabbar Abdullah. On the Dynamics of Hurricanes. New York University, 1953.
Abdul Jabbar Abdullah. Group-velocity of Atmospheric Waves. Massachusetts Institute of Technology, 1946.

Death
Abdullah died at the Albany Medical Center on July 9, 1969 after long illness.

Legacy
Abdul Jabbar Abdullah is highly regarded by Iraqis, who commemorated his 100th birthday in Iraq and in the diaspora. A hall in the University of Baghdad is named after him, as well as numerous streets.

References

External links
 Abdul Jabbar Abdullah - Official website

Iraqi scholars
Iraqi physicists
Meteorologists
1911 births
1969 deaths
Iraqi Mandaeans
People from Maysan Governorate
Massachusetts Institute of Technology School of Science alumni
University of Colorado faculty
Iraqi emigrants to the United States